Raymond Edward "Gilbert" O'Sullivan (born 1 December 1946) is an Irish singer-songwriter who achieved his most significant success during the early 1970s with hits including "Alone Again (Naturally)", "Clair", and "Get Down". 
O'Sullivan's songs are often marked by his distinctive, percussive piano playing style and observational lyrics using word play.

Born in Waterford, Ireland, O'Sullivan settled in Swindon, England, as a child. In 1967, O'Sullivan began pursuing a career in music. Worldwide, he has charted 16 top 40 records including six No. 1 songs, the first of which was 1970's "Nothing Rhymed". Across his career, he has recorded 19 studio albums. The music magazine Record Mirror voted him the top UK male singer of 1972. He has received three Ivor Novello Awards, including “Songwriter of the Year” in 1973.

Early life
Raymond Edward O'Sullivan was born on 1 December 1946 in Cork Road, Waterford, Ireland. He was one of six children; his mother May ran a sweet shop and his father was a butcher with Clover Meats. The O'Sullivans emigrated due to a job offer in England. The family first moved to Battersea, London when Raymond was seven, before settling in Swindon, Wiltshire a year later. Raymond began playing piano here, later explaining: "I come from a working class background, but we always had a piano, the thinking of my parents was that if one of your kids could play it, you could make some money at it." A period of going to piano lessons was short-lived, as O'Sullivan was not enamoured of music theory and played the pieces by ear instead. Raymond's father died two years after the move to Swindon.

Raymond attended St Joseph's Catholic College before studying at Swindon College, specialising in graphic design. Here, he played with several semi-professional bands including the Doodles, the Prefects and was most notably a drummer in a band called Rick's Blues, along with Malcolm Mabbett (guitar), Keith Ray (bass), and founder Rick Davies. Davies, who later founded Supertramp, taught O'Sullivan how to play both drums and piano. O'Sullivan's drumming informed his style of piano-playing, which often utilises a distinct, percussive piano pattern. O'Sullivan has explained "My left hand is hitting the high hat and the right hand is the snare." He started writing songs, heavily influenced by the Beatles as writers and Bob Dylan as a performer.

Music career

In 1967, O'Sullivan moved from Swindon to London in pursuit of a career in music. Determined to get a record deal and looking to stand out, he created an eye-catching visual image consisting of a pudding basin haircut, cloth cap and short trousers. O'Sullivan has said his love of silent film inspired the look. He scored a five-year contract with April Music, CBS Records' house publishing company, after coming to the attention of the professional manager Stephen Shane, who also suggested changing his name from Ray to Gilbert as a play on the name of the operetta composers Gilbert & Sullivan. He was paid an advance of £12 (equivalent to £ as of ), with which he bought a piano. He was signed to CBS Records by the A&R manager Mike Smith, who produced the Tremeloes, the Marmalade and the Love Affair.

His first single was "Disappear", produced by Mike Smith and released in November 1967 credited to the mononym 'Gilbert'. It failed to chart, as did his second single "What Can I Do", released in April 1968. A switch to the Irish record label Major Minor in 1969 yielded a third single "Mr. Moody's Garden", again unsuccessful. O'Sullivan then sent some demo tapes to Gordon Mills, the manager of Tom Jones and Engelbert Humperdinck, whereupon O'Sullivan was signed to Mills' newly founded label, MAM Records. Mills reportedly hated O'Sullivan's self-created image, but O'Sullivan insisted on using it initially. O'Sullivan's unique signature look garnered much attention, and often saw him compared to the Bisto Kids. O'Sullivan explained his thinking behind his appearance in a 1971 interview: "My mother probably doesn't like Neil Young because she hates the way he looks, his hair and everything. If you can get them interested in the way you look then they tend to like the music. The thing which I'm trying to create is of the thirties; Keaton and Chaplin."

Early success
At the end of 1970, O'Sullivan achieved his first UK top 10 hit with "Nothing Rhymed", which also reached number one in the Netherlands, where it earned O'Sullivan his first gold disc. Over 1971, O'Sullivan scored hits with "Underneath The Blanket Go" (which also reached number one in the Netherlands), "We Will" and "No Matter How I Try", the latter being named "Best Ballad or Romantic Song" at the 17th Ivor Novello Awards in 1972. O'Sullivan released his debut album, Himself, in August 1971. It received a warm critical reception, with O'Sullivan's observational and conversational style of songwriting garnering comparisons to Paul McCartney and Randy Newman. O'Sullivan opted not to tour in promotion of the album, but did however make a number of appearances on British television during 1971, most notably recording an edition of BBC In Concert broadcast 18 December 1971.

In 1972 O'Sullivan achieved major international fame with "Alone Again (Naturally)", a ballad which touches on suicide and loss. The single peaked at no. 3 in the UK but in America spent six non-consecutive weeks at number one on [[Billboard Hot 100|Billboard'''s Hot 100]], selling nearly two million copies. It peaked at no. 2 in New Zealand (during an 11-week chart run), spent two weeks at number one in Canada (13 weeks in the Top 40); and reached number one in Japan (during a 21-week chart run). In America the single ranked no. 2 (behind Roberta Flack's "The First Time Ever I Saw Your Face") in [[Billboard Year-End Hot 100 singles of 1972|Billboard's year-end chart]], based on both sales and airplay. In 1973 both titles were Grammy-nominated for both Song of the Year and Record of the Year, with Flack winning in both categories. This international success coincided with a new image, with O'Sullivan discarding the appearance he'd used since 1967. He unveiled a more modern 'college-like' look in which he often wore a sweater bearing a large letter 'G'. This was a deliberate attempt to prevent "[making] an impact like Tiny Tim" in the US that "would have taken years to shake off," and the subsequent American edition of Himself, which included "Alone Again (Naturally)", featured an updated image of O'Sullivan on the album artwork. O'Sullivan followed up on the success of "Alone Again (Naturally)" with "Clair", which reached no. 2 in the United States on the Hot 100 and no. 1 in the UK, Norway, France, Belgium, Ireland and Canada (14 weeks in the Canadian Top 40). Its parent album (and O'Sullivan's second), Back to Front, spawned a further hit with "Out of the Question", which reached no. 17 in the US and no. 14 in Canada. 
O'Sullivan's disc sales exceeded ten million in 1972 and made him the top star of the year. O'Sullivan's success led to his taking part in the BBC's anniversary programme Fifty Years of Music in November 1972. O'Sullivan was ranked by Record Mirror as the number 1 male singer of 1972, and in May 1973, he won an Ivor Novello award for "British Songwriter of the Year."

1973 saw the release of O'Sullivan's third album, I'm a Writer, Not a Fighter, which reflected a new emphasis on rock music and funk influences. Its lead single, the electric keyboard-based "Get Down", reached number one in the UK, Belgium and Germany, no. 7 in both the US and Canada, and no. 3 in the Netherlands. Following "Alone Again (Naturally)" and "Clair", "Get Down" was O'Sullivan's third million-seller, with the RIAA gold disc award presented on 18 September 1973.

O'Sullivan enjoyed nearly five years of success with MAM, a run that included seven UK top 10 singles and four UK top 10 albums; three US top 10 singles and one top 10 album; five Dutch top 10 singles and three top 10 albums; five New Zealand top 10 singles; three Canadian top 10 singles; and seven Japan top 10 singles. By 1974, his sales were decreasing. His fourth album A Stranger In My Own Back Yard, was his first to miss the top five on the UK Albums Chart, charting at no. 9. Its lead single, "A Woman's Place", generated controversy due to its lyric ("I believe / A woman's place is in the home"), seen by some as sexist. It was O'Sullivan's first single since his 1970 breakthrough to miss the top 40 of the UK Singles Chart, reaching a peak of no. 42. His November 1974 single "Christmas Song" reached no. 12 in the UK and no. 5 in Ireland. In June 1975, O'Sullivan had his last top 20 hit, "I Don't Love You But I Think I Like You".

Gilbert released a fifth album with MAM in 1977, Southpaw, but it failed to chart. O'Sullivan discovered his recording contract with MAM Records greatly favoured the label's owner, Gordon Mills. A lawsuit followed, with prolonged argument over how much money his songs had earned and how much of that money he had actually received. Eventually, in May 1982, the court found in O'Sullivan's favour, describing him as a "patently honest and decent man", who had not received a just proportion of the vast income his songs had generated. They awarded him £7 million in damages (£ as of ). Although he had won, the court battle put his recording career on hold, and has said he was unable to obtain management or a major record label deal.

Later career
In 1980, after a five-year hiatus, he returned to his old record label, CBS.

The first single, "What's in a Kiss?", reached No. 19 in the UK in 1980 and No. 21 in Japan. It was his first UK top 20 hit in five years. Following the release of his subsequent 1980 and 1982 albums, Off Centre and Life & Rhymes, and due in part to the then-ongoing MAM court case, O'Sullivan released no new material between 1983 and 1986. Apart from the single "So What?" in 1990 and a compilation album in 1991, Nothing But the Best, O'Sullivan was absent from the charts until another compilation album, The Berry Vest of Gilbert O'Sullivan, returned him to the UK top 20 in 2004.

O'Sullivan is also noted for his role in bringing about the practice of clearing samples in hip hop music as a result of the 1991 court case Grand Upright Music, Ltd. v. Warner Bros. Records, Inc., in which he sued rapper Biz Markie over the rights to use a sample of his song "Alone Again (Naturally)". He won 100% of the royalties and made sampling an expensive undertaking.

O'Sullivan has continued to record and perform into the 21st century. He enjoys particular acclaim in Japan. His album A Scruff at Heart was released in 2007, featuring "Just So You Know". On 14 July 2008, O'Sullivan released "Never Say Di". He appeared at the 2008 Glastonbury Festival, and played London's Royal Albert Hall on 26 October 2009. On 26 August 2010, O'Sullivan announced that he had joined Hypertension, a record company whose artists have included Leo Sayer, Chris DeBurgh, Fleetwood Mac and Gerry Rafferty.

His album Gilbertville was released on 31 January 2011; it featured "All They Wanted to Say", which dealt with the 2001 attacks on the World Trade Center, and his single "Where Would We Be (Without Tea)?". On 19 July 2011, O'Sullivan played live on the BBC Radio 2 Ken Bruce Show. On 26 August that year, the documentary Out on His Own was broadcast by BBC 4 (before by Irish RTÉ). In March 2012, the compilation album Gilbert O'Sullivan: The Very Best Of – A Singer & His Songs entered the UK Albums Chart at No. 12. 2015 saw Gilbert re-emerge on Irish and BBC radio and television. He toured Ireland beginning of June, and on 8 June 2015 his Peggy Lee-inspired album Latin ala G! was released.

On 24 August 2018, O'Sullivan released his 19th studio album Gilbert O'Sullivan. The album entered the UK Album Chart at No. 20, his first UK charting studio album for over 40 years.

July 22, 2022, O'Sullivan released his 20th studio album Driven, producer by Andy Wright. The album received the best reviews in over 50 years. The album also managed to enter the UK Album Chart at No. 26.

Personal life
O'Sullivan purposely avoided dating at the peak of his career; he feared that doing so would inhibit his songwriting abilities. In January 1980, O'Sullivan married his Norwegian girlfriend Aase Brekke. Later that year, the first of their two daughters, Helen-Marie, was born. Tara was born two years later.

He currently lives in Jersey.

Album discography

 Himself (1971)
 Back To Front (1972)
 I'm a Writer, Not a Fighter (1973)
 A Stranger in My Own Back Yard (1974)
 Southpaw (1977)
 Off Centre (1980)
 Life & Rhymes (1982)
 In the Key of G (1989)
 Sounds of the Loop (1991)
 By Larry (1994)
 Every Song Has Its Play (1995)
 Singer Sowing Machine (1997)
 Irlish (2001)
 Piano Foreplay (2003)
 A Scruff At Heart (2007)
 Gilbertville (2011)
 Latin a 'la G! (2015)
 Gilbert O'Sullivan (2018)
 Driven (2022)

See also
List of artists who reached number one on the UK Singles Chart
List of artists who reached number one in the United States
List of artists who reached number one on the U.S. Adult Contemporary chart
List of performers on Top of the Pops

References

External links

 Official Gilbert O'Sullivan page
 
 [ Biography at Allmusic]

1946 births
Living people
20th-century composers
21st-century composers
20th-century pianists
21st-century pianists
Irish emigrants to the United Kingdom
British soft rock musicians
British pop pianists
British male pianists
British male singer-songwriters
British pop singers
People from Waterford (city)
CBS Records artists
MAM Records artists
EMI Records artists
Victor Records artists
People from Swindon
20th-century British male singers